Lorenzo Quaglio (25 May 1730 – 7 May 1804) was a German stage designer of Italian extraction.  He worked mainly in Mannheim and in Munich, where he designed the first production of Mozart's opera Idomeneo.

References
James Anderson, The Complete Dictionary of Opera and Operetta.

1730 births
1804 deaths
German scenic designers
Opera designers